Life-Size is a 2000 American fantasy-comedy television film directed by Mark Rosman and starring Lindsay Lohan and Tyra Banks. It originally premiered on March 5, 2000 on ABC as part of The Wonderful World of Disney block. The film follows a young girl whose "Eve" doll is transformed into a real person.

A sequel, titled Life-Size 2: A Christmas Eve, premiered on December 2, 2018 on Freeform with Tyra Banks reprising her role.

Plot
Casey Stuart (Lohan) is a tomboyish girl who is the quarterback of her school's 7th-grade football team. Since her mother died two years ago, she has been avoiding her old friends and arguing with a boy on her team. Wanting to bring her mother back to life, Casey finds a book called "The Book of Awakenings" at a local bookstore. The book contains a section on resurrecting the dead, and a successful resurrection will become permanent unless it’s undone before sunset on the fourth day after it begins. However, since the book was expensive, she left all the money she had on the shelf in a glass compartment, which is where the book was.

Following the book's instructions, Casey collects artifacts from her mother's life, including locks of her hair in her hairbrush. However, the resurrection is unwittingly sabotaged when Drew McDonald, a woman who works with and is romantically interested in Casey's widowed father, Ben, gives Casey a mall shopping Eve doll for her birthday. Eve is a plastic doll in the form of a young pretty woman, manufactured by Marathon Toys. She has many accessories, including outfits appropriate to taxing careers such as law enforcement, medicine and outer space, and lives in Sunnyvale, "in the middle of America".

As Casey is preparing to resurrect her mother, Drew stops by to give her the doll for her birthday and uses the hairbrush to brush the doll's hair. With strands from Casey's Eve doll remaining on the brush as Casey utters the incantation, the magic acts on the doll rather than Casey's mother, and Casey wakes up the next morning to find Eve in bed with her in a real form. Casey is upset by this, but Eve (Banks) is excited about being a real woman.

Over the next few days, Eve buys clothes at the local shopping mall, uses her police training to stop a truck that almost runs Casey over, smells and eats for the first time, tries and fails miserably to do secretarial work, sings her theme song on stage during a dance with Ben, and almost sets the Stuarts' kitchen on fire. She also helps Casey cope with the loss of her mother. Meanwhile, Casey learns that she needs the second volume of the magic book to reverse Eve's spell.

During this time, tension builds between Casey and her father, who has been missing her football games while trying to secure a promotion in his law firm. The tension is further increased by Ben's attraction to Eve, which Casey resents as a betrayal to her mother. Eve helps people turn into a better version of themselves, especially Ellen, Ben's coworker.

As the film proceeds, Casey and Eve gradually become friends. Eve displays insight and sensitivity in talking with Casey about her mother, and she helps Casey with her self-confidence. In exchange, Casey gives Eve tips on how to be a popular doll and a good role model. By the time the magic book arrives at the local bookstore, Casey has decided she likes Eve, so she does not buy it. Unfortunately, Eve has been getting homesick.

Discouraged by her difficulties in being a real woman and worried about being cancelled by Marathon, Eve decides to undo the spell herself. After buying the book and saying goodbye to Ben at Casey's championship game, she goes to Sunnyvale, a specially decorated room at Marathon headquarters, and recites the incantation. When Casey and Ben arrive, she tearfully bids them farewell and turns back into a doll. Sometime later, with the lessons learned from her experiences in the real world, Eve becomes a popular toy again. Casey kept her old friendships, Ben is promoted at work and Drew takes him to lunch.

The film ends with the cast dancing to Eve's theme song ("Be a Star"), with an apparently still-real Eve singing and dancing along.

Cast

Production

Casting
The film was made-for-television. Lohan didn't have to audition for the role of Casey Stuart, the girl whose doll comes to life. The producers of the film offered her the role as a part of a three-picture contract with The Walt Disney Company. Banks was given the role of Eve, the doll that is magically transformed into a live woman during Casey's attempt to bring her mother back to life. Costume designer Maya Mani said, "It was a joy to work with Tyra because she knows how to wear clothes. No matter what we put on her, she could carry it off."

Filming
Filming took place for three weeks, in Vancouver, British Columbia. The film was originally going to premiere as a part of The Wonderful World of Disney on February 27, 2000. It was delayed by one week, and later released on March 5.

Music
George Blondheim and Mark Rosman wrote a song titled "Be a Star" that Tyra Banks sings at a business party. The song is the theme song for the film, and was also reprised at the end of the film. Two songs by the Irish girl group B*Witched were used in the film: "C'est la Vie" and "Rollercoaster". A song from Nobody's Angel's debut album, "Keep Me Away", was used near the end of the film.

Sequels

A sequel to the movie was first reported in November 2012. In January 2014, Disney Channel announced that they were working on a sequel to Life-Size titled Life-Size 2, with Tyra Banks reprising the role of Eve. In March 2015, Banks tweeted that they were still working on the script. In September 2015, Banks said to Hollywood Life: "We have gotten many drafts of scripts, and the one thing I can say is that to the Disney Channel executives, Life-Size is so precious. It's like their baby, so they just want it perfect. They keep redoing it, and redoing it, and redoing the script, and we are in another round of redos, and we're hoping for Christmas 2016." Banks once again announced her involvement with the film during an interview with Variety in December 2015: "There is no one else that can play Eve but me, thank you very much! I'm just joking with you, but yes, I am going to be Eve."

In April 2017, it was announced the film would debut on Freeform in December 2018. Banks stated in a January 2018 interview that the script was almost finished, and that production was expected to start in the summer of 2018. In July, Francia Raisa was confirmed to star. In mid-November 2018, it was announced on Freeform TV that Life-Size 2 would debut on December 2, 2018.

In February 2020, Banks revealed she was working on Life-Size 3. In October 2022, the possible sequel was also brought up while Banks hosted Dancing with the Stars on Disney+.

References

External links
 
 

2000s English-language films
2000s American films
2000 television films
2000 films
2000 comedy films
2000 fantasy films
2000s children's comedy films
2000s children's fantasy films
2000s fantasy comedy films
American children's comedy films
American children's fantasy films
American fantasy comedy films
American comedy television films
Disney television films
Fantasy television films
Films about dolls
Films about size change
Films directed by Mark Rosman
Films shot in Vancouver
Films about sentient toys